Anröchte is a municipality in the district of Soest, in North Rhine-Westphalia, Germany.

Geography
It is situated approximately 13 km south of Lippstadt and 15 km east of Soest.

Neighbouring municipalities
 Bad Sassendorf
 Erwitte
 Rüthen
 Warstein

Division of the town
After the local government reforms of 1975 Anröchte consists of 10 districts:
 Anröchte (7.087 inhabitants)
 Altengeseke (901 inhabitants)
 Altenmellrich (370 inhabitants)
 Berge (715 inhabitants)
 Effeln (7.520 inhabitants)
 Klieve (381 inhabitants)
 Mellrich (767 inhabitants)
 Robringhausen (153 inhabitants)
 Uelde (1.100 inhabitants)
 Waltringhausen (102 inhabitants)

Twin towns
  Radków (Poland) – since 1954

People 
 Gotthard Kettler (1517-1587),last Master of the Livonian Order and the first Duke of Courland and Semigallia.

References

External links 
Official site 

Municipalities in North Rhine-Westphalia
Soest (district)